The 2004–05 Wichita Thunder season was the 13th season of the CHL franchise in Wichita, Kansas.

Regular season

Division standings

Awards

See also
2004–05 CHL season

External links
2004–05 Wichita Thunder season at Hockey Database

Wichita Thunder seasons
Wich
Wich